Maybelle Reichardt (later Hopkins, May 27, 1907 – November 4, 1999) was an American discus thrower who won the AAU Championship in 1925 and 1928. In 1928 she also set a national record and placed seventh at the Olympics in Amsterdam, Netherlands. Besides athletics, Reichardt won a national basketball title with the Los Angeles Athletic Club in 1926. She later worked as a registered nurse, got married, and had two sons; both sons became college professors.

References

1907 births
1999 deaths
American female discus throwers
Olympic track and field athletes of the United States
Athletes (track and field) at the 1928 Summer Olympics
Track and field athletes from Los Angeles
20th-century American women